Nova Bassano is a municipality and a city in the state of Rio Grande do Sul, south Brazil.

History
Nova Bassano was established by Italian immigrants around 1890. Among them was Padre Pedro Antônio Colbachini, a Catholic priest member of the Scalabrini congregation, who is regarded together with his companions as the founder of the town. In those days, the town had been called Bassano in memory of the North Italian town of Bassano del Grappa (Province of Vicenza) from which the immigrant were coming. In 1939, during the Second World War, it was renamed Silva Pais, but in 1947, with the unanimous assent of the population, it was named Nova Bassano in tribute to the first immigrants.

Until 1898 the town was part of the municipality (Port.: município) of Lagoa Vermelha. Through successive administrative reforms it formed part of the municipalities of Veranópolis and Nova Prata. By virtue of State Law n° 4730 23 May 1964 Nova Bassano became a municipality of its own.

Geography

Nova Bassano is situated in the state's mountainous Serra Gaúcha region. It occupies an area of 211.612 km².

The neighboring municipalities are on the north Nova Araçá, on the east Nova Prata, on the south Nova Prata and Vista Alegre do Prata, on the west Serafina Corrêa and Guaporé. The population was estimated by the Brazilian Institute of Geography and Statistics to amount to 10,005 in 2020.

Economy

The municipality enjoys one of the highest Human Development Index (IDH) of the state and of Brazil, i.e. 0.844, placing it on the 39th rank of the 3.527 municipalities of the country. Nova Bassano's economy is strong and is characterized by its diversification, extending to agriculture, wine production, industry, food industry and commerce. The metal industry is particularly present in the municipality because several companies have established there.

Education and culture
Nova Bassano's school capacity exceeds 1.200 students, the Colbachini College (Port.: Colégio Padre Colbachini) being the major educative institution of the municipality. Furthermore, there are computer schools, a Municipal Library and a Cultural Society.

Tourism and attractions
The locality's interest is enhanced by the vicinity of the Serra Gaúcha mountain. Nova Bassano hosts many plants native of the region, including 100 species of recognized native trees. The main tourist sights of the municipality are:
 the public municipal museum (MPMNB) exhibiting historic artifacts in particular relating to the Italian early settlement.
 the huge Church Chiesa Matriz Sagrado Coração de Jesus, where the first mass of the region was celebrated at Christmas 1895, with a side Bell tower of 30 meters supporting a clock watch built in 1938.
 the Rodeios park.
 the chapel and cross of the mount Paréu (monte Caravágio), the highest peak of the region.
 the Grotta Nossa Senhora de Lourdes
 the square Padre Cobachini
 the wine route (port.: Rota uva e vinho) in the Serra Gaúcha mountain
 the Zanetti quarter with the "balnéario" of the Rio Carreiro.

Religion
Most of the Bassanense belong to the Roman Catholic Church. The Patron Saint of the city is the Sacred Heart of Jesus.

Events and festivals 
 23 May: anniversary of the constitution (Port.: Emancipação) of the municipality
 8 December: Immaculate Conception
 June: Corpus Christi

Transports and communications
Nova Bassano is linked through highways RS 324 e BR/RS 470. Nearby  airports include Caxias do Sul (Campo dos Bugres) at 73 km and the Passo Fundo airport at 81 km.

Climate
Nova Bassano's climate is of the humid subtropical type (Cfa). The mean temperature is 18 °C and varies between 5 °C and 35 °C. Mean rainfalls amount to 1650 mm.

Government 
The first elections took place on 10 January 1965. Since then, the population of Nova Bassano has elected the following mayors:

Notable persons 
 Don Laurindo Guizzardi: Catholic bishop, author of the book Nova Bassano: das origens ao raiar do século XX;
 Padre Pedro Antônio Colbachini: he was the first priest to migrate to Nova Bassano from Bassano del Grappa. Padre Colbachini (or Colbacchini) was a member of the Scalabrini congregation.

References

Further reading (in Portuguese)
Dom Laurindo Guizzardi. Nova Bassano: das origens ao raiar do século XX. Caxias do Sul (RS): Universidade de Caxias do Sul (UCS), 1992, 125 pp. In the Biblioteca fatea
Firléia Guadagnin Radin. Centenário da primeira missa em Nova Bassano: 25.12.1896 a 25.12.1996. Passo Fundo: Pe. Berthier dos Missionários da Sagrada Família, 1995, 78 pp. In the Brazilian National Library
 Samira Dall'Agnol. A leitura e seu valor social. Um estudo sobre práticas de leitura e condições socioeconómicas e culturais. Caxias do Sul (RS): University of Caxias do Sul (UCS), 2007, 139 pp. (Chapter 1.1, pp. 18–23 Nova Bassano: um município em pesquisa). pdf
 Vanderlan Alves de Souza. Histórico do Município de Nova Bassano. pdf
 Vitalina M. Frosi, Giselle O. dal Corno, Carmen M. Faggion. Topônimos na RCI: Resgate da identidade cultural. Caxias do Sul (RS): University of Caxias do Sul (UCS). pdf

External links
Nova Bassano in English on db-city.com
 Official page of the municipality of Nova Bassano
 Municipal information on famurs.com
 Official page of the State of Rio Grande do Sul
 Nova Bassano on DB.com
 Nova Bassano on the site of the Federation of Associations of Municipalities of Rio Grande do Sul
 Nova Bassano on the site of the Foundation for Economics and Statistics of Rio Grande do Sul
 Site of the Colégio Colbachini
 Official 2007 population data

See also
List of municipalities in Rio Grande do Sul

Municipalities in Rio Grande do Sul